Lithuania national field hockey team may refer to:
 Lithuania men's national field hockey team
 Lithuania women's national field hockey team